Buchin is a commune in Caraș-Severin County, western Romania with a population of 2,147 people. It is composed of five villages: Buchin, Lindenfeld (Karánberek), Poiana (Sebesmező), Prisian (Perestyén) and Valea Timișului (Körpa). It is situated in the historical region of Banat.

Lindenfeld village has been depopulated since 1998.

Natives
 Imre Erőss

References

Communes in Caraș-Severin County
Localities in Romanian Banat